My Drug Hell 2 is the second studio album by British rock trio My Drug Hell.

Track listing

Personnel 

 Tim Briffa – Vocals, Guitar
 David Preston – Bass guitar
 Sebastian Kellig – Drums

2010 albums